Simon Fraser may refer to:

Universities 
 Simon Fraser University, a university named for the Canadian explorer
 Simon Fraser Clan, the athletic program of Simon Fraser University

People

Lairds of Lovat 
 Simon Fraser, 1st Laird of Lovat (died 1333)

Lords Lovat 
 Simon Fraser, 6th Lord Lovat (1572–1633), see Lord Lovat
 Simon Fraser, 11th Lord Lovat (1667–1747), Scottish Jacobite and Chief of Clan Fraser
 Simon Fraser, 13th Lord Lovat (1828–1887), Scottish peer
 Simon Fraser, 14th Lord Lovat (1871–1933), Roman Catholic aristocrat, soldier, politician and Chief of Clan Fraser
 Simon Fraser, 15th Lord Lovat (1911–1995), Chief of the Clan Fraser and British soldier
 Simon Fraser, 16th Lord Lovat (born 1977), Chief of Clan Fraser

Other people 
 Sir Simon Fraser (d. 1306), fought in the Wars of Scottish Independence
 Simon Fraser of Lovat (1726–1782), Jacobite leader and British general during the Seven Years' War and American Revolutionary War
 Simon Fraser of Balnain (1729–1777), British general during the American Revolutionary War
 Simon Fraser (1738–1813), British lieutenant-general, raised the 133rd (Highland) Regiment of Foot and a company for the 71st
 Simon Fraser, the younger of Lovat (1765–1803), commanded the Fraser Fencibles in Ireland and was M.P. for Inverness-shire
 Simon Fraser (explorer) (1776–1862), Canadian explorer
 Sir Simon Fraser (Australian politician) (1832–1919), member of the Australian Senate, father of the below
 Simon Fraser (Australian sportsman) (1886–1919), Australian rules footballer and Olympic rower, son of the above
 Sir Simon Fraser (diplomat) (born 1958), British Permanent Under-Secretary of the Foreign and Commonwealth Office
 Simon Fraser (comics), British comic artist
 Simon Fraser (American football) (born 1983), American football defensive end
 Simon Fraser, Master of Lovat (1939–1994)
 Simon Fraser (Queensland politician) (1824–1889), Queensland politician
 Simon Alexander Fraser (1845–1934), Australian bagpiper, stockman, and whip-maker

Other uses 
 CCGS Simon Fraser, a buoy tender operated by the Canadian Coast Guard from 1960 to 2001